The 27th Annual Nickelodeon Kids' Choice Awards was held on March 29, 2014, at the Galen Center in Los Angeles, California. Actor Mark Wahlberg hosted the ceremony. The "Orange Carpet" was set up in front of Galen Center on the sidewalks of Jefferson Boulevard. The show was broadcast on Nickelodeon from 8 p.m. to 9:36 p.m. ET/PT and tape delayed for the West Coast in the United States and Canada, along with the rest of Nickelodeon's international channels, some of which contributed locally based awards and local segments tying into the American broadcast. Voting was available worldwide on seventeen voting websites in various nations and regions, along with mobile voting depending on region. The "Kids’ Choice Awards Orange Carpet pre-show" was webcast prior to the presentation of the awards.

Presenters and performers and stunts

Host
 Mark Wahlberg
 Jeff Sutphen, Sydney Park, and Ryan Newman (Orange Carpet)

Musical performers
 Todrick Hall - Kids' Choice Awards medley
 Austin Mahone - "Mmm Yeah" (pre-show)
 Aloe Blacc  "Wake Me Up"/"The Man" (with the MUSYCA Children's Choir)
 American Authors - "Best Day of My Life"

Presenters

 Lea Michele
 LL Cool J
 Pharrell Williams
 Kaley Cuoco
 Michael Strahan
 Chris Rock
 Zahra Savannah Rock
 America Ferrera
 Will Arnett
 Jayma Mays
 Ariana Grande
 Cameron Ocasio
 Maree Cheatham
 Zoran Korach
 Kenan Thompson (via video)
 Kel Mitchell
 Nathan Kress
 Noah Munck

 Christopher Massey
 Victoria Justice
 Leon Thomas III
 Avan Jogia
 Matt Bennett
 Daniella Monet
 Drake Bell
 Josh Peck
 Chris Evans Kristen Bell
 Ryan Seacrest (via video)
 Keith Urban (via video)
 Harry Connick, Jr. (via video)
 Andy Samberg
 Brie and Nikki Bella
 John Cena
 Jim Parsons
 Queen Latifah (via video)

Guest appearances

 The stars of Duck Dynasty''
 Shaun White
 Cody Simpson
 Austin Mahone
 One Direction (via video)
 Optimus Prime (voiced by Peter Cullen) (via video screen)
 Nicola Peltz
 Jack Reynor
 David Blaine

Mosh pit
 Debby Ryan
 Tia Mowry-Hardrict
 Carlos Pena Jr.
 Zendaya
 Jake Short
 Bella Thorne
 James Maslow
 Peta Murgatroyd
 Kendall Schmidt
 Sophia Grace & Rosie

Winners and nominees
The nominees were announced on February 24, 2014.
Winners are listed first, in bold. Other nominees are in alphabetical order.

Movies

Television

Music

Miscellaneous

References

External links
 

Nickelodeon Kids' Choice Awards
Kids' Choice
Kids' Choice Awards
2014 in Los Angeles
Kids' Choice Awards
March 2014 events in the United States
Kids' Choice Awards